Lisewo-Parcele  is a settlement (colony) in Greater Poland Voivodeship, Poland located in the Gmina Skulsk, Konin County.

References

Lisewo-Parcele